Melanoma-associated antigen 4 is a protein that in humans is encoded by the MAGEA4 gene.

This gene is a member of the MAGEA gene family. The members of this family encode proteins with 50 to 80% sequence identity to each other. The promoters and first exons of the MAGEA genes show considerable variability, suggesting that the existence of this gene family enables the same function to be expressed under different transcriptional controls.

Clinical importance 
The MAGEA genes are clustered at chromosomal location Xq28. They have been implicated in some hereditary disorders, such as dyskeratosis congenita. At least four variants encoding the same protein have been found for this gene.

In salivary gland carcinomas, MAGE4 expression correlates to lower-grade histology, lower likelihood of metastases and more favourable survival.

While MAGEA4 is expressed by many tumours, it is almost universally expressed by synovial sarcomas. A targeted treatment to use genetically modified autologous T cells is  undergoing clinical trials.

References

Further reading